Dominik Tóth  (3 August 1925 – 16 May 2015) was a Slovak Catholic bishop.

Born in Kostolný Sek, he was ordained a priest in Trnava and appointed the titular bishop of Ubaba in 1990. Tóth retired as the auxiliary bishop of Bratislava in 2004, and died in 2015.

References

21st-century Roman Catholic bishops in Slovakia
1925 births
2015 deaths
People from Šurany
20th-century Roman Catholic bishops in Slovakia